Desert Breeze Park located in Spring Valley, Nevada, is one of the largest parks in the Clark County park system.  The regional park is a  facility that is not fully developed.

Community Center
The community center offers meeting space, a pool and a water play area.

Other facilities
Baseball diamonds
Basketball courts
Children's play area
Dog Park
Picnic areas
The Skate Park
Soccer fields

Special events
Dessert Breeze is the host for many events, including Bite of Las Vegas.

Transportation
The park is served by the 202 and 203 RTC bus routes.

References

Parks in Nevada
Spring Valley, Nevada